Huey Creek is a glacial meltwater stream,  long, flowing south from an ice field west of Mount Falconer to the north-central shore of Lake Fryxell, in Taylor Valley, Victoria Land, Antarctica. The name was suggested by hydrologist Diane McKnight, leader of a United States Geological Survey (USGS) team that made extensive hydrological studies in the Lake Fryxell basin, 1987–94. The name acknowledges support received by the USGS field team in Taylor Valley from U.S. Navy Squadron VXE-6 and its twin engine UH-1N "Huey" helicopters.

References

Rivers of Victoria Land
McMurdo Dry Valleys